Marco Marchetti (c. 1528 – 1588) was an Italian painter of the late-Renaissance or Mannerist period. Born in Faenza, he is also known as Marco da Faenza. He painted an Adoration by the shepherds (1567)  originally in the church of the confraternity of Santa Maria dell'Angelo, but now in the pinacoteca of Faenza. He also painted along with Giorgio Vasari  a series of frescoes in the Palazzo Vecchio representing the Life of Hercules. He painted an altarpiece representing the Martyrdom of St. Catherine of Alexandria (1580) in the church of Sant'Antonio in Faenza.

Corrado Ricci describes him as an artist in Ravenna whose little narrative scenes, crowded with figures, and whose lively "grotesques" were appreciated and sought after both in Rome and Florence.

Notes

External links

He is cited in the Vite by Giovanni Baglione p. 21.
Daniela Grandini La pittura devozionale di Marco Marchetti artista faentino del cinquecento (Devotional Paintings by Marco Marchetti, Faventine Artist of the 1500s), Cesena: Stilgraf, 2005.
Alessandra Bigi Iotti, Giulio Zavatta La "Conversione di San Paolo" di Marco Marchetti ai Servi, L'Arco, 7/2009, 2/3, p. 40-49.

1520s births
1588 deaths
People from Faenza
16th-century Italian painters
Italian male painters
Italian Renaissance painters
Mannerist painters